Jean-Claude Bouillaud (7 June 1927 – 20 June 2008) was a French film and television actor.

Biography 
Jean-Claude Bouillaud is the son of Charles Bouillaud, prolific actor from the 1940s to the 1960s. He first worked for about fifteen years as a bank employee. After a career in the amateur theater, he became a professional actor playing with Philippe Noiret at the Théâtre National Populaire with Jean Vilar as a director. A background and supporting actor, unknown but familiar to the audience, he was very popular with film directors like Claude Chabrol, Claude Sautet and Yannick Andréi. In television, he acted in many crime series.

Partial filmography 

 Mr. Freedom (1969)
 The Bar at the Crossing (1972) .... Carletti
 Au-delà de la peur (1975)
 Womanlight (1979) .... Le pilote de ligne
 Laisse-moi rêver (1979) .... fireman
 L'Entourloupe (1980) .... grocery store owner
 The Horse of Pride (1980)
 A Bad Son (1980) .... Henri
 La Provinciale (1980)
 La Boum (1980) .... Boum father #2
 Bobo la tête (1980)
 Celles qu'on n'a pas eues (1981)
 Les hommes préfèrent les grosses (1981) .... fishmonger
 Le Choix des armes (1981) .... André
 Le Professionnel (1981) .... Agent service secret #2
 Tête à claques (1982) .... bistrot owner
 The Hatter's Ghost (1982) .... Louise's father
 Le Père Noël est une ordure (1982) .... Katia's father
 Tir groupé (1982)
 La Java des ombres (1983) .... cab driver
 Waiter! (1983) .... Urbain
 Ronde de nuit (1984) .... Jérôme Martineau, a civil servant
 Le Joli Cœur (1984) .... Ducasse
 Pinot simple flic (1984) .... embarrassed policeman
 Tir à vue (1984) .... Blanchard
 My New Partner (1984) .... a guard
 The Twin (1984) .... the inspector
 Hors-la-loi (1985) .... first policeman
 Chicken with Vinegar (1985) .... Gérard Filiol
 La Baston (1985) .... Raymond Levasseur
 Black Mic-Mac (1986) .... Bidault
 Charlie Dingo (1987) .... garage mechanic
 A los cuatro vientos (1987)
 Trois places pour le 26 (1988) .... captain
 Eskorpion (1989) .... Fermin
 Le Vent de la Toussaint (1991) .... hotel owner
 Madame Bovary (1991) .... Father Rouault, a farmer, Emma's father
 A Heart in Winter (1992) .... bar owner
 Lettre pour L... (1993)
 Justinien Trouvé, ou le bâtard de Dieu (1993)
 Les Misérables (1995) .... brigadier in 1830

External links 
 

1927 births
2008 deaths
French male film actors
French male television actors
Male actors from Le Havre
20th-century French male actors